Squadron Leader Lord David Douglas-Hamilton (8 November 1912 – 2 August 1944) was a Scottish nobleman, pilot, and boxer.

He was the youngest son of Lt. Alfred Douglas-Hamilton, 13th Duke of Hamilton RN and his wife Nina, née Poore.

Douglas-Hamilton was one of four brothers who made history by simultaneously being at the rank of squadron leader or above at the outset of World War II, he himself commanding No. 603 Squadron RAF from 18 December 1941 till 20 July 1942.

Educated at Harrow, and Balliol College, Oxford. Douglas-Hamilton saw active service between 1939 and 1944, flying Spitfires in Operation Torch over Malta. On return to Britain, he was killed whilst carrying out reconnaissance over the French coast, and crashed in southern England.

At the 1934 Empire Games he won the bronze medal in the heavyweight class of the boxing tournament.

Marriage and issue
On 15 October 1938 he married Ann Prunella Stack, the leader of the Women's League for Health and Beauty.
They had two sons:
 Diarmaid Douglas-Hamilton (b. 1940), an astrophysicist at Harvard University
 Iain Douglas-Hamilton (b. 1942), Zoologist, also father of television presenter Saba Douglas-Hamilton

See also
 Douglas Douglas-Hamilton, 14th Duke of Hamilton
 George Nigel Douglas-Hamilton, 10th Earl of Selkirk
 Lord Malcolm Douglas-Hamilton

External links
 time.com October 1944

1912 births
1944 deaths
Scottish male boxers
Heavyweight boxers
Boxers at the 1934 British Empire Games
Commonwealth Games bronze medallists for Scotland
People educated at Harrow School
Alumni of Balliol College, Oxford
Scottish aviators
Royal Air Force squadron leaders
Younger sons of dukes
Royal Air Force pilots of World War II
Aviators killed by being shot down
Royal Air Force personnel killed in World War II
Commonwealth Games medallists in boxing
Medallists at the 1934 British Empire Games